Richard Hartshorne (February 29, 1888 – September 14, 1975) was a United States district judge of the United States District Court for the District of New Jersey.

Education and career

Born in Newark, New Jersey, Hartshorne received a Bachelor of Letters from Princeton University in 1909 and a Bachelor of Laws from Columbia Law School in 1912. He was in private practice in New Jersey from 1912 to 1931, also serving in the United States Naval Reserve as a Lieutenant, J.G., during World War I, and as a Special Assistant to the United States Attorney for the District of New Jersey in 1925. He was a Judge of the County Court in Newark from 1931 to 1951, and during that time was President of the New Jersey Interstate Commission on Crime from 1935 to 1943.

Federal judicial service

On October 17, 1951,  Hartshorne was nominated by President Harry S. Truman to a seat on the United States District Court for the District of New Jersey vacated by Judge Guy Leverne Fake. Hartshorne was confirmed by the United States Senate on October 19, 1951, and received his commission on October 20, 1951. He assumed senior status on October 29, 1961. Hartshorne served in that capacity until his death on September 14, 1975.

References

Sources
 

1888 births
1975 deaths
Princeton University alumni
Columbia Law School alumni
Politicians from Newark, New Jersey
Judges of the United States District Court for the District of New Jersey
United States district court judges appointed by Harry S. Truman
20th-century American judges
United States Navy officers
American military personnel of World War I
Lawyers from Newark, New Jersey